CPNT may stand for:

 The Rurality Movement, formerly known as Hunting, Fishing, Nature, Tradition (French: Chasse, Pêche, Nature, Traditions, abbreviated as CPNT), a French agrarian political party
Nature Protection and Tourism Club (Romanian: Clubul pentru Protectia Naturii si Turism), a mountain and ecology Romanian club